Orlovsky District is an administrative and municipal district (raion), one of the forty-three in Rostov Oblast, Russia. It is located in the southeast of the oblast. Its administrative center is the rural locality (a settlement) of Orlovsky. Population: 40,894 (2010 Census);  The population of the administrative center accounts for 48.9% of the district's total population.

References

Notes

Sources

Districts of Rostov Oblast